Newbill-McElhiney House is a historic home located at St. Charles, St. Charles County, Missouri. The original three-bay section was built in 1836, and expanded to five bays in the 1850s.  It is a two-story, five bay, Federal style brick dwelling. It has a side-gable roof and features a three-bay central porch. Also on the property is a contributing small two-story "L-plan" brick building rumored to have been used as a slave quarters.

It was added to the National Register of Historic Places in 1972. It is located in the St. Charles Historic District.

References

Individually listed contributing properties to historic districts on the National Register in Missouri
Houses on the National Register of Historic Places in Missouri
Federal architecture in Missouri
Houses completed in 1836
Buildings and structures in St. Charles County, Missouri
National Register of Historic Places in St. Charles County, Missouri
Slave cabins and quarters in the United States